Dolinar is a Slovenian surname. Notable people with the surname include:

Aleš Dolinar (born 1979), Slovenian motorcycle speedway rider
Elvira Dolinar (1870–1961), Slovenian writer, feminist and teacher
Ivan Dolinar (1840–1886), Slovenian politician, teacher and journalist
Žarko Dolinar (1920–2003), Croatian biologist and table tennis player

Slovene-language surnames